The  is a commuter rail line in Osaka-Kobe-Kyoto Metropolitan Area, operated by West Japan Railway Company (JR West). The line was completed in 1974 by the former Japanese National Railways (JNR) to provide faster access from the Kansai region to the Hokuriku region. It originates at Yamashina Station in Yamashina-ku, Kyoto and ends at Ōmi-Shiotsu Station in Nagahama, Shiga.

Its name means "the line to the west of the lake," indicating that it approximately parallels the western shore of Biwako. Trains continue from Omi-Shiotsu Station to Tsuruga Station on the Hokuriku Main Line Yamashina to Kyoto Station on the Tōkaidō Main Line for convenient transfer to lines serving the Kansai as well as the Tōkaidō Shinkansen.

In addition to local, Rapid and Special Rapid services, limited express trains such as the Thunderbird, as well as freight trains are frequently operated on the line. Only few of limited express trains stop at Katata or Omi-Imazu and others skip all stations on the line.

History
A direct Tsuruga – Kyoto line was included in the 1922 Railway Construction Act.

In the meantime, the Kojaku Railway Co. opened a line from Hamaotsu on the Keihan Ishiyama Sakamoto Line 51 km to Omi-Imazu between 1923 and 1929. Between 1947 and 1965 there was a connection between Zeze on the Tokaido Main Line and Hamaotsu, allowing direct connection to the Tokaido Line.

The line was purchase by JNR and closed in 1969 so the Kosei line could be constructed over parts of the alignment, with the entire new line opening in 1974 as a dual track electrified line with CTC signalling.

The section from Nagahara to Ōmi-Shiotsu, originally electrified with 20 kV AC, was re-electrified to 1,500 V DC on September 24, 2006 enabling DC-only EMUs used in Osaka-Kyoto region to operate, and the Special Rapid through train service from JR Kyoto Line (Tokaido Main Line) was extended beyond Ōmi-Shiotsu to Tsuruga on the Hokuriku Main Line.

Services and stations
Legends:

● : All trains stop
○ : Only "Kosei Leisure (湖西レジャー)" extra seasonal service (in winter) makes stop at Shiga
| : All trains skip

Local (普通) trains stop at all stations, but they do not operate through services to the JR Kyoto Line.

Rapid (快速) trains operate only in the mornings, which heads south to the JR Kyoto Line. 2 services are operated every weekday morning and 1 service is operated every weekend morning.

Special Rapid (新快速) trains operate one train per hour for both directions, throughout daytime.

Only 4-car trains are capable of going as far as Tsuruga at the moment, and the rear eight cars in a 12-car set are uncoupled at Omi-Imazu Station.

Rolling stock

Current

Passenger

Local and Rapid
 113 series (within the line and to Kyoto only)
 117 series (same as above)
 207 series
 221 series (mostly through rapid services to the Tokaido Main Line and the Sanyo Main Line, also some operate as local)
 223-6000 series (same as above)
 321 series
 521-0 series (only through services continuing to the Hokuriku Main Line)

Special Rapid and Local
 223-1000/2000 series
 225-0/100 series

Limited Express
 681 series (Thunderbird services)
 683 series (Thunderbird services)

Freight
 EF81
 EF510

Former

EMU
 125 series (until March 2009)
 201 series 
 419 series (until October 2006)
 475 series (until October 2006)
 485 series (Raichō services, until March 2011)

DMU
 KiHa 20 series (until 1991)
 KiHa 26 series (until 1991)
 KiHa 48 (until 1991)

See also
 List of railway lines in Japan

References

Lines of West Japan Railway Company
Railway lines opened in 1974
1067 mm gauge railways in Japan